Events from the year 1987 in Czechoslovakia.

Incumbents
President: Gustáv Husák.
Prime Minister: Lubomír Štrougal.

Events
21 February – The 1987 Winter Universiade opens in Štrbské Pleso, closing seven days later.
 July – The fourth and final reactor in the Dukovany Nuclear Power Station is put into operation.
17 December – Gustáv Husák resigns as General Secretary of the Communist Party of Czechoslovakia.

Popular culture

Film
Why?, directed by Karel Smyczek is released.
Princess Jasnenka and the Flying Shoemaker, directed by Zdeněk Troška, is released.

Births
27 May – Martina Sáblíková, winner of the gold medal in speed skating at the 2010 and 2014 Winter Olympics.

Deaths
6 May – Stanislav Lusk, rower, gold medal winner at the 1952 Summer Olympics (born 1931).

References

Citations

Bibliography

Czechoslovakia
1987 in Czechoslovakia
Czechoslovakia
1980s in Czechoslovakia
Years of the 20th century in Czechoslovakia